The 1969 Wimbledon Championships was a combined men's and women's tennis tournament that was played on outdoor grass courts. It was the second edition of the Wimbledon Championships in the Open Era and the 83rd since its formation. It was held at the All England Lawn Tennis and Croquet Club at Wimbledon, London from Monday 23 June until Saturday 5 July 1969. Ann Jones became the first British champion of the open era, the first victor since 1961; Britain would have to wait 8 years, until the 1977 tournament to see another British winner in the singles competition – Virginia Wade. Rod Laver won the men's singles title, his fourth Wimbledon crown after 1961, 1962 and 1968, and went on to win his second Grand Slam after 1962.

41-year-old Pancho Gonzalez beat Charlie Pasarell in a first-round men's singles match by a score of 22–24, 1–6, 16–14, 6–3, 11–9. At 112 games and 5 hours 20 minutes it was by far the longest match of the time. The match led to the introduction of the tiebreak in tennis. The 112-game record lasted 41 years until the Isner–Mahut match at the 2010 Wimbledon Championships.

Prize money
The total prize money for 1969 championships was £33,370. The winner of the men's title earned £3,000 while the women's singles champion earned £1.500.

* per team

Champions

Seniors

Men's singles

 Rod Laver defeated  John Newcombe, 6–4, 5–7, 6–4, 6–4

Women's singles
 
 Ann Jones defeated  Billie Jean King, 3–6, 6–3, 6–2

Men's doubles

 John Newcombe /  Tony Roche defeated  Tom Okker /  Marty Riessen, 7–5, 11–9, 6–3

Women's doubles

 Margaret Court /  Judy Tegart defeated  Patti Hogan /  Peggy Michel, 9–7, 6–2

Mixed doubles

 Fred Stolle /  Ann Jones defeated  Tony Roche /  Judy Tegart, 6–2, 6–3

Juniors

Boys' singles

 Byron Bertram defeated  John Alexander, 7–5, 5–7, 6–4

Girls' singles

 Kazuko Sawamatsu defeated  Brenda Kirk, 6–1, 1–6, 7–5

Singles seeds

Men's singles
  Rod Laver (champion)
  Tony Roche (semifinals, lost to John Newcombe)
  Tom Okker (quarterfinals, lost to John Newcombe)
  Ken Rosewall (third round, lost to Bob Lutz)
  Arthur Ashe (semifinals, lost to Rod Laver)
  John Newcombe (final, lost to Rod Laver)
  Clark Graebner (third round, lost to Bob Hewitt)
  Cliff Drysdale (quarterfinals, lost to Rod Laver)
  Roy Emerson (fourth round, lost to Cliff Drysdale)
  Andrés Gimeno (fourth round, lost to Clark Graebner)
  Fred Stolle (fourth round, lost to John Newcombe)
  Pancho Gonzales (fourth round, lost to Arthur Ashe)
  Ray Moore (first round, lost to John Alexander)
  Bob Hewitt (first round, lost to Cliff Richey)
  Dennis Ralston (fourth round, lost to Tony Roche)
  Stan Smith (first round, lost to Allan Stone)

Women's singles
 Margaret Court (semifinals, lost to Ann Jones)
 Billie Jean King (final, lost to Ann Jones)
 Virginia Wade (third round, lost to Pat Walkden)
 Ann Jones (champion)
 Nancy Richey (quarterfinals, lost to Ann Jones)
 Kerry Melville (second round, lost to Rosemary Casals)
 Julie Heldman (quarterfinals, lost to Margaret Court)
 Judy Tegart (quarterfinals, lost to Billie Jean King)

References

External links
 Official Wimbledon Championships website

 
Wimbledon Championships
Wimbledon Championships
Wimbledon Championships
Wimbledon Championships